Elena Djionat (1888-fl. 1936), was a Romanian educator, journalist, suffragist and women's rights activist. She was co-founder and leader of the Organizatja Reuniunii Femeilor Basaribene (Organization of Bessarabian Women) in 1928-1935.

Life
Djionat was born in the Russian Empire and educated at the University of Odessa before becoming a teacher at the Princess Elena Primary School in Chisnau, and principal there in 1919-1935. She became involved in feminist work in 1907, but focused more on unification with Romania until Bessarabia became a part of Romania in 1919, after which she engaged in women's rights issue in response to the neglect of Romania to give women the right to vote. The women's rights movement was split in the 1930s between her and Elena Amistar. Nothing about her is known after 1936.

References
 Francisca de Haan, Krasimira Daskalova & Anna Loutfi: Biographical Dictionary of Women's Movements and Feminisms in Central, Easterna and South Eastern Europe, 19th and 20th centuries. Central European University Press, 2006

1888 births
Romanian women's rights activists
Romanian feminists
Year of death missing